The Pirate Tapes is a documentary filmed by Somali-Canadian Mohamed Ashareh in Somalia and edited and produced by Palmira PDC in Canada. The film follows Ashareh, as he infiltrates a Somali pirate operation, giving a first person view of how they recruit and organize. The documentary premiered at the Hot Docs Canadian International Documentary Festival in 2011. It was picked up for distribution by HBO Documentary Films.

The Plot 
Ashareh lives undercover with pirates in Somalia for months during 2009, filming their activities with a small camera hanging around his neck. Some of the filming was done by a second cameraman. Ashareh was frequently in danger, and at one point they were both arrested and spent time in a Somali jail.

Reception 
The film has been heavily criticized for shortcomings attributed to Ashereh's lack of journalistic and filming experience. There has also been a dispute between Ashareh and Palmira PDC over the rights to the footage filmed by Ashereh. Andrew Moniz of Palmira PDC maintains the contracts "clearly" state Palmira would own the footage.

References

External links
 

Piracy in Somalia
Documentary films about crime
Canadian documentary films
Somalian documentary films
Pirate films
2011 films
2011 documentary films
English-language Somalian films
2010s English-language films
2010s Canadian films